Material World was a Canadian television sitcom, which aired on CBC Television from 1990 to 1993. In its first season, the show was a conventional sitcom, shot on videotape with a laugh track, but in subsequent seasons the show adopted a single-cam comedy drama format.

The show starred Laura Bruneau as Kitty, a Toronto fashion designer. The cast also included Linda Sorenson as Kitty's mother Virginia (Seasons 1-4), Jayne Eastwood as her office assistant Bernice (Seasons 1-3), Chris Potter as her boyfriend Tim (Seasons 1-3), Angela Dohrmann as her downstairs neighbor and then roommate Angela (Seasons 3-4), James Kee as her business partner Martin (Seasons 3-4), and Karen LeBlanc as her store employee Lucy (Season 4).

The show's original theme song, "World of Wonder", was composed by series creator Jane Ford and performed by actress and singer Taborah Johnson. Johnson, who is the sister of actor Clark Johnson, appeared in the opening credits, singing the song on a street corner. Season four saw a change to the opening credits sequence, using Bob Wiseman's "What the Astronaut Noticed and Then Suggested" as its new theme music.

It won the Gemini Award for Best Comedy Series at the 5th Gemini Awards in 1990.

Episodes

Season 1 (1990)

Season 2 (1991)

Season 3 (1991-1992)

Season 4 (1992-1993)

References

External links

 
 TVArchive

CBC Television original programming
Television shows set in Toronto
1990 Canadian television series debuts
1993 Canadian television series endings
Gemini and Canadian Screen Award for Best Comedy Series winners
1990s Canadian comedy-drama television series